Far Rockaway–Lockwood's Grove is a former station on the Long Island Rail Road's Cedarhurst Cut-off that was located between Beach 21st Street and Beach 22nd Street in Far Rockaway, Queens. The old stationhouse was located roughly between the present Wavecrest and Mott Avenue stations when the entire line was at grade.

On about July 1, 1871, before the extension to Far Rockaway opened, the line was leased to the Long Island Railroad. Far Rockaway–Lockwood's Grove was opened by the New York and Rockaway Railroad on May 14, 1872 with the extension of the Cedarhurst Cut-off.  The section of the Cedarhurst Cut-off between Far Rockaway and Lockwood's Grove was later known as "The Grove Track". The station closed in September 1877. Lockwood's Grove's original station building was moved to Syosset station in 1877 after the station was abandoned. The building was renovated in 1944, but was torn down and replaced in 1948.

References

Former Long Island Rail Road stations in New York City
Transportation in Rockaway, Queens
Railway stations in the United States opened in 1872
Railway stations closed in 1877
Railway stations in Queens, New York
1872 establishments in New York (state)
1877 disestablishments in New York (state)